The UK Championship, known as the ISPS Handa UK Championship for sponsorship reasons, was a professional golf tournament which was held 27–30 August 2020 at The Belfry, in Wishaw, Warwickshire, England.

The tournament was intended to be a one-off event and was the final leg of a six-week "UK swing" on the European Tour during the 2020 season. The UK swing was created as part of sweeping changes to the tour's schedule due to the COVID-19 pandemic.

Brendan Lawlor received a sponsor's invitation into the tournament and made history as he became the first disabled golfer to play in a European Tour event.

Rasmus Højgaard won the event, defeating Justin Walters in a playoff to claim his second European Tour win.

Winners

References

External links
Event page on the official site of the European Tour

Former European Tour events
Golf tournaments in England
Sport in Warwickshire